Winterbach may refer to the following places in Germany:

Winterbach, Rems-Murr, is a town in the district of Rems-Murr in Baden-Württemberg in Germany. It is 25 km east of Stuttgart. 
Winterbach, Gunzburg, is a community in the Günzburg District in Swabia, in Bavaria, in Germany. It is 40 km northwest of the city of Augsburg. 
Winterbach, Bad Kreuznach, is a municipality in the district of Bad Kreuznach in Rhineland-Palatinate, in western Germany. It is 25 km southwest of Bingen am Rhein.
Winterbach (St. Wendel), is a district 6 km west of the city of St. Wendel, or Sankt Wendel, in Saarland, Germany. 
Winterbach, Südwestpfalz, is a community in the district of Südwestpfalz, in Rhineland-Palatinate, in western Germany. It is 12 km northeast of the city of Zweibrucken, and 20 km northwest of the city of Pirmasens.

Winterbach may refer to the following places in Austria:

Winterbach, Scheibbs District, is a community with a railway station 6 km southeast of the town of  Sankt Anton an der Jessnitz, in the Scheibbs District in Lower Austria.